= CSCL Asia =

Container ship owned by Arisa Navigation Co Ltd

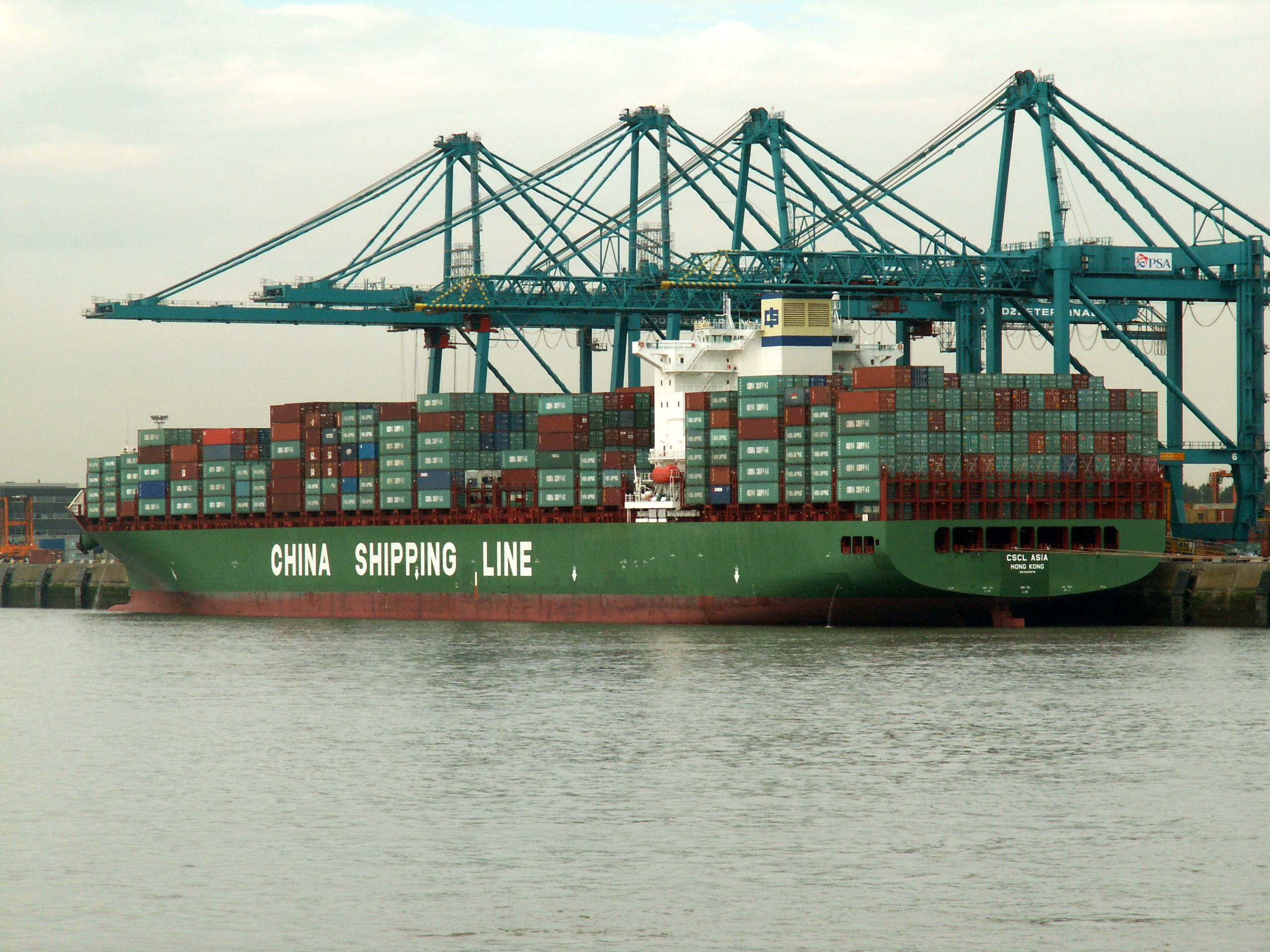
- CSCL Asia at the Port of Antwerp, Belgium

History
- Name: CSCL Asia
- Owner: Arisa Navigation Co Ltd
- Operator: China Shipping Container Lines Co Ltd.
- Builder: Samsung Heavy Industries Co Ltd
- Yard number: 1488
- Launched: 27 April 2004
- Completed: 2004
- Maiden voyage: 2004
- Identification: MMSI number: 477360800; Official No: HK-1332; Call Sign: VRAB8; IMO number: 9285976
- Status: Active

General characteristics
- Class & type: LR container ship
- Length: 334 m (1,095 ft 10 in)
- Beam: 43 m (141 ft 1 in)
- Draught: 14.5 m (47 ft 7 in)
- Depth: 24.6 m (80 ft 9 in)
- Installed power: 68,490 kW (91,850 hp) B&W 1 × 2 Stroke 12 cy. 980 x 2,400, Doosan engine
- Propulsion: 1 oil engine 1 FP propeller
- Speed: 25.2 knots (46.7 km/h; 29.0 mph)
- Capacity: 8,500

CSCL Asia is a container ship owned by Arisa Navigation Co Ltd, and sails under a Hong Kong flag. It was the largest container ship in the world when it was built. It is one of five vessels that will be deployed from Asia to the West Coast of the U.S. On July 13, 2004, CSCL Asia made its voyage from the Hong Kong International Terminals in Kwai Chang.

== Hull and engine ==
CSCL Asia has a length of 334 m (1,095 ft 10 in). It is a fully cellular container ship, that has a capacity of 8,500 TEU, with 19 hatches, 9 holds, and 700 reefer plugs.

CSCL Asia has a B&W 12K98MC-C, 2-stroke, 12-cylinder engine, capable of producing 68,490 kW (91,850 hp), driving a fixed pitch propeller. The ship's engine was built by Doosan Engine. The ship also has an auxiliary generator, that is a 4 × 2, 2,700 kW 6,600V 60 Hz. The ship also has onboard boilers.
